Anguispira is a genus of small air-breathing land snails, terrestrial pulmonate gastropod mollusks in the family Discidae, the disk snails.

Species
Species:
Anguispira alabama 
Anguispira alternata 
Anguispira cumberlandiana 
Anguispira fergusoni 
Anguispira holroydensis 
Anguispira jessica 
Anguispira knoxensis 
Anguispira kochi 
Anguispira macneilli 
Anguispira mordax 
Anguispira nimapuna 
Anguispira picta  = painted snake-coiled forest snail
Anguispira rugoderma 
Anguispira russelli 
Anguispira stihleri 
Anguispira strongyloides 
Synonyms
 Anguispira clarki Vanatta, 1924: synonym of Anguispira fergusoni (Bland, 1862)
 † Anguispira simplex Russell, 1955: synonym of † Haplotrema simplex (Russell, 1955) (new combination)
 Anguispira strigosa (A. Gould, 1846): synonym of Oreohelix strigosa (A. Gould, 1846) (unaccepted combination)

References 

 Bank, R. A. (2017). Classification of the Recent terrestrial Gastropoda of the World. Last update: July 16th, 2017

Discidae
Taxonomy articles created by Polbot